Richard Gasquet was the defending champion, but did not compete in the juniors that year.

Jo-Wilfried Tsonga won the tournament, defeating Marcos Baghdatis in the final, 7–6(7–4), 6–3.

Seeds

Draw

Finals

Top half

Section 1

Section 2

Bottom half

Section 3

Section 4

Sources
Draw

Boys' Singles
US Open, 2003 Boys' Singles